Mu Columbae (μ Col, μ Columbae) is a star in the constellation of Columba. It is one of the few O-class stars that are visible to the unaided eye. The star is known to lie approximately 1,300 light years from the Solar System (with an error margin of a few hundred light years).

This is a relatively fast rotating star that completes a full revolution approximately every 1.5 days. (Compare this to the Sun, which at only 22 percent of this star's diameter rotates only once every 25.4 days.) This rate of rotation is fairly typical for stars of this class.

Based on measurements of proper motion and radial velocity, astronomers know that this star and AE Aurigae are moving away from each other at a relative velocity of over 200 km/s. Their common point of origin intersects with Iota Orionis in the Trapezium cluster, some two and half million years in the past. The most likely scenario that could have created these runaway stars is a collision between two binary star systems, with the stars being ejected along different trajectories radial to the point of intersection.

Etymology
In Chinese astronomy, Mu Columbae is called 屎, Pinyin: Shǐ, meaning "Excrement" or "The Secretions", because this star is marking itself and stand alone in the asterism of the same name within the Three Stars mansion.

References

Further reading
 
 

Columba (constellation)
O-type main-sequence stars
Runaway stars
Suspected variables
Columbae, Mu
1996
038666
Durchmusterung objects
027204